Clapham High Street railway station is on the South London line in Clapham, within the London Borough of Lambeth, Greater London. It is served by London Overground services, with a limited service to  under the control of the London Rail division of Transport for London.

It is close to  tube station, and interchange between the two is counted as an Out of Station Interchange on Oyster, so that users are charged for only one journey, rather than two separate journeys.

History
The station was opened on 25 August 1862 by the London, Chatham and Dover Railway (LCDR) as Clapham, renamed Clapham & North Stockwell from May 1863. The London, Brighton and South Coast Railway (LBSCR) route (current Atlantic Line, often referred to by its old name of South London Line) was authorized by an 1863 Act of Parliament and parallels the original 1862 LCDR route eastwards between Wandsworth Road and Brixton and beyond. Until the 1923 grouping all lines through the station were owned by the LCDR, with two leased to the LBSCR for their sole use.

The original 'south' 1862 line was leased to the LBSCR in 1867 and the LCDR used the new 'north' 1867 lines.

The existing platforms, together with the Grade II listed 1862 station building, form the original station. These platforms were used by the LCDR from 1862 to 1867, and the LBSCR until the 1923 grouping.

The 1867 LCDR platforms were closed on 3 April 1916 and subsequently demolished. The eastbound platform's station building was destroyed by a bomb in 1944.

The LCDR 1866 station building (on the north side) was partially demolished in 1924 after the 1916 closure, finally being demolished in the late 1970s. In British Rail days, access to the platforms was via a subway on the north side.

The original south 1862 building was sold, being initially used as a furniture warehouse before being redeveloped in 2003 as residential accommodation. It is now Grade II listed. The platform had a full-length canopy that was demolished in the late 1970s.

It was re-electrified in 1928 using third rail 660 V DC and the overhead was dismantled.

In 1937 it was renamed Clapham before receiving its current name in 1989 to avoid confusion with Clapham Junction.

In 2012 Southern refurbished the eastbound platform, erecting a new fence and repaving the surface. In late 2012, London Overground erected new waiting shelters and station name signs.

Services

The typical off-peak and peak service is four London Overground trains per hour to Clapham Junction and four trains per hour to Dalston Junction via Shoreditch High Street, joining the East London line at Surrey Quays.

As a result, all Southern services were withdrawn and replaced with London Overground services, with four trains calling per hour.

Parliamentary services

In December 2013 the out of service working between Battersea Park and Dalston Junction was converted to part passenger working running in service weeknights as the 23:09 Battersea Park-Clapham High Street via Wandsworth Road. The train terminated at Clapham High Street before running 'dead' to Dalston Junction and then Silwood Sidings. From May 2016 this service became the 23:03 Battersea Park-Dalston Junction, thereby providing a near complete service from Battersea Park weeknights.

As of the December 2019 timetable change, there is one early-morning Southeastern service to Ashford International (via Bromley South and Maidstone East), departing at 05:59 Monday to Friday, usually formed of a Class 465 Networker unit. There is no return working.

Connections
London Buses routes 50, 88, 155, 322, 345 and P5 and night route N155 serve the station.

References

External links

Department for Transport letter regarding the withdrawal of Victoria services

Railway stations in the London Borough of Lambeth
Former London, Chatham and Dover Railway stations
Railway stations in Great Britain opened in 1862
Railway stations served by London Overground
Clapham
1862 establishments in England
Grade II listed buildings in the London Borough of Lambeth
Grade II listed railway stations